GQ Lupi b, or GQ Lupi B, is a possible extrasolar planet, brown dwarf or sub-brown dwarf orbiting the star GQ Lupi.  Its discovery was announced in April 2005.  Along with 2M1207b, this was one of the first extrasolar planet candidates to be directly imaged.  The image was made with the European Southern Observatory's VLT telescope at the Paranal Observatory, Chile on June 25, 2004. 

 GQ Lupi b has a spectral type between M6 and L0, corresponding to a temperature between 2,050 and 2,650 kelvins.  Located at a projected distance of about 100 AU from its companion star, giving it an orbital period of perhaps about 1,200 years, it is believed to be several times more massive than Jupiter.  Because the theoretical models which are used to predict planetary masses for objects in young star systems like GQ Lupi b are still tentative, the mass cannot be precisely specified — models place GQ Lupi b's mass anywhere between a few Jupiter masses and 36 Jupiter masses.  At the highest end of this range, GQ Lupi b could be classified as a small brown dwarf, but at the lowest end of this range, it could be classified as an extremely large Jupiter-like exoplanet rather than a brown dwarf. 

If classified as an exoplanet, with a maximum radius of 6.5 times that of Jupiter (or 930,000 km in diameter), this would make GQ Lupi b one of largest exoplanets discovered, although the size of the planet is shrinking as it evolves.

As of 2006, the International Astronomical Union  Working Group on Extrasolar Planets described GQ Lupi b as a "possible planetary-mass companion to a young star." GQ Lupi b is listed as a "confirmed planet" as of 2020.

See also
2M1207b
List of largest exoplanets

References

External links

Lupus (constellation)
Exoplanets detected by direct imaging
Exoplanets discovered in 2005